Ilhan Abdullahi Omar (born October 4, 1982) is an American politician serving as the U.S. representative for  since 2019. She is a member of the Democratic–Farmer–Labor Party. Before her election to Congress, Omar served in the Minnesota House of Representatives from 2017 to 2019, representing part of Minneapolis. Her congressional district includes all of Minneapolis and some of its first-ring suburbs.

Omar serves as whip of the Congressional Progressive Caucus and has advocated for a $15 minimum wage, universal healthcare, student loan debt forgiveness, the protection of Deferred Action for Childhood Arrivals, and abolishing U.S. Immigration and Customs Enforcement (ICE). A frequent critic of Israel, Omar supports the Boycott, Divestment and Sanctions (BDS) movement and has denounced its settlement policy and military campaigns in the occupied Palestinian territories, as well as what she describes as the influence of pro-Israel lobbies in American politics.

Omar is the first Somali American and the first naturalized citizen of African birth in the United States Congress, and the first woman of color to represent Minnesota. She is also one of the first two Muslim women (along with Rashida Tlaib) to serve in Congress. She has been the target of several death threats, as well as derogatory comments by political opponents, including Donald Trump, as a result of her background.

Early life and education 
Omar was born in Mogadishu, Somalia, on October 4, 1982, and spent her early years in Baidoa, Somalia. She was the youngest of seven siblings, including sister Sahra Noor. Her father, Nur Omar Mohamed, an ethnic Somali from the Majeerteen clan of Northeastern Somalia, was a colonel in the Somali army under Siad Barre and also worked as a teacher trainer. Her mother, Fadhuma Abukar Haji Hussein, a Benadiri, died when Ilhan was two. She was raised by her father and grandfather, who were moderate Sunni Muslims opposed to the rigid Wahhabi interpretation of Islam. Her grandfather Abukar was the director of Somalia's National Marine Transport, and some of Omar's uncles and aunts also worked as civil servants and educators. She and her family fled Somalia to escape the Somali Civil War and spent four years in a Dadaab refugee camp in Garissa County, Kenya, near the Somali border.

Omar's family secured asylum in the U.S. and arrived in New York in 1995, then lived for a time in Arlington, Virginia, before moving to and settling in Minneapolis, where her father worked first as a taxi driver and later for the post office. Her father and grandfather emphasized the importance of democracy during her upbringing, and at age 14 she accompanied her grandfather to caucus meetings, serving as his interpreter. She has spoken about school bullying she endured during her time in Virginia, stimulated by her distinctive Somali appearance and wearing of the hijab. She recalls gum being pressed into her hijab, being pushed down stairs, and physical taunts while she was changing for gym class. Omar remembers her father's reaction to these incidents: "They are doing something to you because they feel threatened in some way by your existence." Omar became a U.S. citizen in 2000 when she was 17 years old.

Omar attended Thomas Edison High School, from which she graduated in 2001, and volunteered as a student organizer. She graduated from North Dakota State University in 2011 with a bachelor's degree, majoring in political science and international studies. Omar was a Policy Fellow at the University of Minnesota's Humphrey School of Public Affairs.

Early career 

Omar began her professional career as a community nutrition educator at the University of Minnesota, working in that capacity from 2006 to 2009 in the Greater Minneapolis–Saint Paul area. In 2012, she served as campaign manager for Kari Dziedzic's reelection campaign for the Minnesota State Senate. Between 2012 and 2013, she was a child nutrition outreach coordinator at the Minnesota Department of Education.

In 2013, Omar managed Andrew Johnson's campaign for Minneapolis City Council. After Johnson was elected, she served as his senior policy aide from 2013 to 2015. During a contentious precinct caucus that turned violent in February 2014, she was attacked by five people and was injured. According to MinnPost, the day before the caucus, Minneapolis city council member Abdi Warsame had told Johnson to warn Omar not to attend the meeting.

As of September 2015, Omar was the Director of Policy Initiatives of the Women Organizing Women Network, advocating for women from East Africa to take on civic and political leadership roles. In September 2018, Jeff Cirillo of Roll Call called her a "progressive rising star".

Minnesota House of Representatives

Elections 

In 2016, Omar ran on the Democratic–Farmer–Labor (DFL) ticket for the Minnesota House of Representatives in District 60B, which includes part of northeast Minneapolis. On August 9, Omar defeated Mohamud Noor and incumbent Phyllis Kahn in the DFL primary. Her chief opponent in the general election was Republican nominee Abdimalik Askar, another activist in the Somali-American community. In late August, Askar announced his withdrawal from the campaign. In November, Omar won the general election, becoming the first Somali-American legislator in the United States. Her term began on January 3, 2017.

Tenure and activity 
During her tenure as state Representative for District 60B, Omar was an Assistant Minority Leader for the DFL caucus. She authored 38 bills during the 2017–2018 legislative session.

Committee assignments 
 Civil Law & Data Practices Policy
 Higher Education & Career Readiness Policy & Finance
 State Government Finance

Financial transparency issues 
In 2018, Republican state representative Steve Drazkowski publicly accused Omar of campaign finance violations, claiming that she used campaign funds to pay a divorce lawyer, and that her acceptance of speaking fees from public colleges violated Minnesota House rules. Omar responded that the attorney's fees were not personal but campaign-related; she offered to return the speaking fees. Drazkowski later accused Omar of improperly using campaign funds for personal travel to Estonia and locations in the U.S. Omar's campaign dismissed the accusations as politically motivated and accused Drazkowski of using public funds to harass a Muslim candidate. In response to an editorial in the Minneapolis Star Tribune arguing that Omar should be more transparent about her use of campaign funds, she said: "these people are part of systems that have historically been disturbingly motivated to silence, discredit and dehumanize influencers who threaten the establishment."

In June 2019, Minnesota campaign finance officials ruled that Omar had to pay back $3,500 that she had spent on out-of-state travel and tax filing in violation of state law, plus a $500 fine. The Campaign Finance Board's investigation also found that in 2014 and 2015 Omar had jointly filed taxes with a man she was not legally married to. Unlike some states, Minnesota does not recognize common law marriage, and so such a joint filing is not legally permitted. But experts have said that if the taxpayer files a correction within three years, as Omar's attorney and accountants did in 2016, then there are normally no further consequences, and the Internal Revenue Service is unlikely to pursue punitive measures unless there is a large discrepancy or fraudulent intent. In response to the AP's request for comment, her campaign sent a statement saying, "all of Rep. Omar’s tax filings are fully compliant with all applicable tax law."

U.S. House of Representatives

Elections

2018

On June 5, 2018, Omar filed to run for the United States House of Representatives from Minnesota's 5th congressional district after six-term incumbent Keith Ellison announced he would not seek reelection. On June 17, she was endorsed by the Minnesota Democratic–Farmer–Labor Party after two rounds of voting. Omar won the August 14 primary with 48.2% of the vote. The 5th district is the most Democratic district in Minnesota and the Upper Midwest, (it has a Cook Partisan Voting Index of D+26) and the DFL has held it without interruption since 1963. She faced health care worker and conservative activist Jennifer Zielinski in the November 6 general election and won with 78.0% of the vote, becoming the first Somali American elected to the U.S. Congress, the first woman of color to serve as a U.S. Representative from Minnesota, and (alongside former Michigan state representative Rashida Tlaib) one of the first Muslim women elected to the Congress.

Omar received the largest percentage of the vote of any female candidate for U.S. House in state history, as well as the largest percentage of the vote for a non-incumbent candidate for U.S. House (excluding those running against only minor-party candidates) in state history. She was sworn in on a copy of the Quran owned by her grandfather.

2020

Omar won the Democratic nomination in the August 11 Democratic primary, in which she faced four opponents. The strongest was mediation lawyer Antone Melton-Meaux, who raised $3.2 million in April–June 2020, compared to about $500,000 by Omar; much of Melton-Meaux's funding came from pro-Israel groups. Melton-Meaux was also endorsed by Minnesota's largest newspaper, The Star Tribune. This led some analysts to predict a close race, but Omar received 57.4% of the vote to Melton-Meaux's 39.2%. She defeated Republican Lacy Johnson and Legal Marijuana Now Party candidate Michael Moore in the November 3 general election, with 64.3% of the vote to Johnson's 25.8% and Moore's 9.5%. Omar's margin of victory was 24 points less than Biden's in the district, the highest underperformance of any Democrat in the nation, which Nathaniel Rakich of FiveThirtyEight attributed to increased Republican spending and Moore's progressive pro-marijuana campaign.

2022

In the August 9 Democratic primary, Omar faced former Minneapolis councilman Don Samuels and three other opponents. The campaign primarily focused on crime and Omar's effectiveness in office. Omar's campaign outspent Samuels's $2.1 million to $800,000; Samuels ran television ads while Omar's campaign did not. Omar won the primary with 50.3% of the vote to Samuels's 48.2%, a margin of less than 2,500 votes.

Tenure

Following Omar's election, the ban on head coverings in the U.S. House was modified, and Omar became the first woman to wear a hijab on the House floor. She is a member of the informal group known as "The Squad", whose members form a unified front to push for progressive changes such as the Green New Deal and Medicare for All. The other members of "The Squad" are Ayanna Pressley, Rashida Tlaib, and Alexandria Ocasio-Cortez.

Brian Stelter of CNN Business found that from January to July 2019 Omar had around twice as many mentions on Fox News as on CNN and MSNBC, and about six times the coverage of James Clyburn, a Democratic leader in the House of Representatives. A CBS News and YouGov poll of almost 2,100 American adults conducted from July 17 to 19 found that Republican respondents were more aware of Omar than Democratic respondents. Omar has very unfavorable ratings among Republican respondents and favorable ratings among Democratic respondents. The same is true of the other three members of the Squad.

Legislation

In July 2019, Omar introduced a resolution co-sponsored by Rashida Tlaib and Georgia Representative John Lewis stating that "all Americans have the right to participate in boycotts in pursuit of civil and human rights at home and abroad, as protected by the First Amendment to the Constitution". The resolution "opposes unconstitutional legislative efforts to limit the use of boycotts to further civil rights at home and abroad", and "urges Congress, States, and civil rights leaders from all communities to endeavor to preserve the freedom of advocacy for all by opposing anti-boycott resolutions and legislation". In the same month, Omar was one of 17 Congress members to vote against a House resolution condemning the BDS movement.

On January 7, 2021, Omar led a group of 13 House members introducing articles of impeachment against Trump on charges of high crimes and misdemeanors. The charges are related to Trump's alleged interference in the 2020 presidential election in Georgia and incitement of the attack at the U.S. Capitol in Washington, D.C. by his supporters, which occurred during the certification of electoral votes in the 2020 presidential election that affirmed Joe Biden's victory.

Committee assignments 
 Committee on Education and Labor
Subcommittee on Higher Education and Workforce Investment
Subcommittee on Workforce Protections

Former assignments 
 Committee on the Budget (2019–2021)
 Committee on Foreign Affairs (2019–2023) 
Subcommittee on Africa, Global Health, Global Human Rights and International Organizations
Subcommittee on International Development, International Organizations and Global Corporate Social Impact

Caucuses 
 Congressional Progressive Caucus whip
 Congressional Black Caucus

2021 U.S. Capitol attack 
Speaking after the 2021 United States Capitol attack, Omar said the experience was very traumatizing and that the trauma would last a long time. She said she began to fear for her life when the evacuation began and as she was being escorted to a secure area she made a phone call to the father of her children to "make sure he would continue to tell my children that I loved them if I didn't make it out." She said, "The face of the Capitol will forever be changed. They didn't succeed in stopping the functions of democracy, but I do believe they succeeded in ending the openness of our democracy."

Political positions

Education 
Omar supports broader access to student loan forgiveness programs, as well as free tuition for college students whose family income is below $125,000. Omar supports Bernie Sanders's plan to eliminate all $1.6 trillion in outstanding student debt, funded by an 0.5% tax on stock transactions and a 0.1% tax on bond transactions; she introduced a companion bill in the House of Representatives. In June 2019, Omar and Senator Tina Smith introduced the No Shame at School Act, which would end the marking of—and punishment for—students with school meal debt.

Health care 
Omar supports Medicare for All as proposed in the Expanded and Improved Medicare for All Act.

On July 19, 2022, after the Supreme Court overruled Roe v. Wade in Dobbs v. Jackson Women's Health Organization, Omar and 17 other members of Congress were arrested in an act of civil disobedience for refusing to clear a street during a protest for reproductive rights outside the Supreme Court Building.

Human rights 
Omar has criticized Saudi Arabia's human rights abuses and the Saudi Arabian-led intervention in Yemen. In October 2018, she tweeted: "The Saudi government might have been strategic at covering up the daily atrocities carried out against minorities, women, activists and even the #YemenGenocide, but the murder of #JamalKhashoggi should be the last evil act they are allowed to commit." She also called for a boycott of Saudi Arabia's regime, tweeting: "#BDSSaudi." The Saudi Arabian government responded by having dozens of anonymous Twitter troll accounts it controlled post tweets critical of Omar.

Omar condemned China's treatment of its ethnic Uyghur people. In a Washington Post op-ed, Omar wrote, "Our criticisms of oppression and regional instability caused by Iran are not legitimate if we do not hold Egypt, the United Arab Emirates and Bahrain to the same standards. And we cannot continue to turn a blind eye to repression in Saudi Arabiaa country that is consistently ranked among the worst of the worst human rights offenders." She also condemned the Assad regime in Syria. Omar criticized Trump's decision to impose further sanctions on Iran, saying the sanctions devastated the "country's middle class and increased hostility toward the United States, with tensions between the two countries rising to dangerous levels."

Omar condemned the 2019 Sri Lanka Easter bombings, tweeting, "No person, of any faith, should be fearful in their house of worship."

Omar opposed the October 2019 Turkish offensive into northeastern Syria, writing that "What has happened after Turkey's invasion of northeastern Syria is a disaster—tens of thousands of civilians have been forced to flee, hundreds of Islamic State fighters have escaped, and Turkish-backed rebels have been credibly accused of atrocities against the Kurds."

In October 2019, Omar voted "present" on H.Res. 296, to recognize the Armenian genocide, causing a backlash. She said in a statement that "accountability and recognition of genocide should not be used as cudgel in a political fight" and argued that such a step should include both the Atlantic slave trade and the Native American genocide. In November, after her controversial vote, Omar publicly condemned the Armenian genocide at a rally for presidential candidate Bernie Sanders.

Immigration 
In a March 2019 Politico interview, Omar criticized Barack Obama's "caging of kids" along the Mexican border. Omar accused Politico of distorting her comments and said that she had been "saying how [President] Trump is different from Obama, and why we should focus on policy not politics," adding, "One is human, the other is really not."

In June 2019, Omar was one of four Democratic representatives to vote against the Emergency Supplemental Appropriations for Humanitarian Assistance and Security at the Southern Border Act, a $4.5 billion border funding bill that required Customs and Border Protection to enact health standards for individuals in custody such as standards for "medical emergencies; nutrition, hygiene, and facilities; and personnel training." "Throwing more money at the very organizations committing human rights abuses—and the very Administration directing these human rights abuses—is not a solution. This is a humanitarian crisis ... inflicted by our own leadership," she said.

Infrastructure spending 
On November 5, 2021, Omar was one of six House Democrats to break with their party and vote against the Infrastructure Investment and Jobs Act because it was decoupled from the social safety net provisions in the Build Back Better Act.

Israeli–Palestinian conflict

Support for boycott efforts and other criticisms 

While she was in the Minnesota legislature, Omar was critical of the Israeli government and opposed a law intended to restrict the Boycott, Divestment and Sanctions (BDS) movement. She compared the movement to people who "engage[d] in boycotts" of apartheid in South Africa. During her House campaign, she said she did not support the BDS movement, describing it as counterproductive to peace. After the election her position changed, as her campaign office told Muslim Girl that she supports the BDS movement despite "reservations on the effectiveness of the movement in accomplishing a lasting solution." Omar has voiced support for a two-state solution to resolve the Israeli–Palestinian conflict. She criticized Israel's settlement building in the occupied Palestinian territories in the West Bank.

In 2018, Omar came under criticism for statements she made about Israel before she was in the Minnesota legislature. In a 2012 tweet, she wrote, "Israel has hypnotized the world, may Allah awaken the people and help them see the evil doings of Israel." The comment, particularly the notion that Israel had "hypnotized the world", was criticized as drawing on antisemitic tropes. Then-The New York Times columnist Bari Weiss wrote that Omar's statement tied into a millennia-old "conspiracy theory of the Jew as the hypnotic conspirator". When asked in an interview how she would respond to American Jews who found the remark offensive, Omar replied: "I don't know how my comments would be offensive to Jewish Americans. My comments precisely are addressing what was happening during the Gaza War and I'm clearly speaking about the way the Israeli regime was conducting itself in that war." After reading Weiss's commentary, Omar apologized for not "disavowing the anti-Semitic trope I unknowingly used".

In September 2019, Omar condemned Benjamin Netanyahu's plans to annex the eastern portion of the occupied West Bank known as the Jordan Valley. Omar said Israelis should not vote for Netanyahu in the September 2019 Israeli legislative election.

Remarks on AIPAC and American support for Israel 

In February 2019, Republican House Minority Leader Kevin McCarthy threatened to "take action" against Omar and Rashida Tlaib for their support of the BDS movement. When journalist Glenn Greenwald responded that it was remarkable "how much time U.S. political leaders spend defending a foreign nation even if it means attacking free speech rights of Americans", and tagged Omar for a comment, she replied with a quote from a hip hop song, "It's All About the Benjamins", alluding to the $100 bill of that name. Omar later clarified that she was referring to the well-documented influence pro-Israeli lobbyists, especially AIPAC, exert in Washington. Subsequent criticism of Omar's comments often included misleading or false claims about not only her background but what she had actually said, leading some to accuse her critics of indulging in "anti-Jewish paranoia".

A number of Democratic leadersincluding House Speaker Nancy Pelosi, Majority Leader Steny Hoyer, and Majority Whip Jim Clyburncondemned the tweet, which was interpreted as implying that money was fueling American politicians' support of Israel. The Democratic House leadership released a statement accusing Omar of "engaging in deeply offensive anti-Semitic tropes". The Jewish Democratic Council of America (JDCA) also denounced her statements. Omar issued an apology the next day, saying, "I am grateful for Jewish allies and colleagues who are educating me on the painful history of anti-Semitic tropes", and adding, "I reaffirm the problematic role of lobbyists in our politics, whether it be AIPAC, the NRA or the fossil fuel industry." The Anti-Defamation League accused her of promoting an "ugly conspiracy theory" about putative Jewish influence in politics. Peter Beinart, after tweeting that the controversy was about "policing the American debate over Israel", thought Omar's statement inaccurate, wrong and irresponsible, but argued that her congressional critics were more "bigoted" on Israeli-Palestinian issues than Omar.

On February 27, 2019, Omar said of her critics: "I want to talk about the political influence in this country that says it is OK for people to push for allegiance to a foreign country." The statements were quickly criticized as allegedly drawing on antisemitic tropes. House Foreign Affairs Committee chairman Eliot Engel said it was "deeply offensive to call into question the loyalty of fellow American citizens" and asked Omar to retract her statement. House Appropriations Committee chairwoman Nita Lowey also called for an apology and criticized the statements in a March 3 tweet, which led to an online exchange between the two. In response, Omar reaffirmed her remarks, insisting that she "should not be expected to have allegiance/pledge support to a foreign country in order to serve my country in Congress or serve on committee." Omar said she was simply criticizing Israel, drawing a distinction between criticism of Benjamin Netanyahu and being anti-Semitic. Omar's spokesman, Jeremy Slevin, said Omar was speaking out about "the undue influence of lobbying groups for foreign interests."

Reaction among 2020 Democratic presidential candidates was mixed. Senators Elizabeth Warren, Kamala Harris, and Bernie Sanders defended Omar. While Senator Cory Booker found her comments "disturbing", he recognized that some of the attacks against her had "anti-Islamic sentiment." Kirsten Gillibrand said, "those with critical views of Israel should be able to express their views without employing anti-Semitic tropes about money or influence", but also criticized the Republican Party for censuring Omar while saying “little or nothing” when President Trump "defended white supremacists at Charlottesville."  New York City Mayor Bill de Blasio called Omar's remarks "unacceptable". According to The Guardian, election records archived by OpenSecrets "suggest a correlation between pro-Israel lobby campaign contributions and Democratic presidential candidates' position on the controversy." Some members of the Congressional Black Caucus believed Omar was unfairly targeted because she is a black Muslim, saying that "the Democratic leadership did not draft a resolution condemning Donald Trump or other white male Republicans over their antisemitic remarks." The second round of remarks prompted the Democratic leadership to introduce a resolution condemning antisemitism that did not specifically refer to Omar. After objections by a number of congressional progressive Democrats, the resolution was amended to include Islamophobia, racism, and homophobia. On March 7, the House passed the amended resolution. Omar called the resolution "historic on many fronts" and said, "We are tremendously proud to be part of a body that has put forth a condemnation of all forms of bigotry including anti-Semitism, racism, and white supremacy." Some Minnesota Jewish and Muslim community leaders later expressed continuing concern about Omar's rhetoric and language and indicated that the issue remained divisive in Omar's district.

On March 7, 2019, the U.S. House of Representatives voted 407–23 to condemn "anti-Semitism, Islamophobia, racism and other forms of bigotry" in response to Omar's remarks concerning Israel. On February 2, 2023, the Republican-led House of Representatives passed a resolution, on a party-line vote, to remove Omar from the House Foreign Affairs Committee for what Speaker Kevin McCarthy called "repeated antisemitic and anti-American remarks." Many prominent House Democrats stood by Omar.

Ban from entering Israel

In August 2019, Omar and Representative Rashida Tlaib were banned from entering Israel, a reversal from the July 2019 statement by Israeli Ambassador to the United States Ron Dermer that "any member of Congress" would be allowed in. Israeli Prime Minister Benjamin Netanyahu attributed the ban to Israeli law preventing the entry of people who call for a boycott of Israel (as Omar and Tlaib had done with their support for BDS). Netanyahu also cited Omar and Tlaib listing their destination as Palestine instead of Israel, claiming he thus viewed their visit as an attempt to "hurt Israel and increase its unrest". Netanyahu also said that Omar and Tlaib did not plan on visiting or meeting with any Israeli officials from the government or the opposition, and additionally accused Miftah, the sponsor of Omar's trip, of having members who support terrorism against Israel (in 2016, Israel approved a visit by five U.S. Representatives to Israel that Miftah co-sponsored, but that was before Israel enacted its anti-BDS law). Less than two hours before the ban, President Trump tweeted that Israel allowing the visit would "show great weakness" when Omar and Tlaib "hate Israel & all Jewish people". Omar said that Netanyahu had caved to Trump's demand and that "Trump's Muslim ban is what Israel is implementing". She responded to Netanyahu that she had intended to meet members of Israel's legislative Knesset and Israeli security officials. Both Democratic and Republican legislators criticized the ban and requested that Israel rescind it. AIPAC released a statement saying that it disagreed with Israel's move and that Omar and Tlaib should have been allowed to "experience Israel firsthand", while the head of the American Jewish Committee put out a statement agreeing with AIPAC on the matter. U.S. Representative Max Rose (who is Jewish) also criticized the move to ban Omar, adding that Omar and Tlaib did not speak for the Democratic Party.

LGBT rights 
In March 2019, Omar addressed a rally in support of a Minnesota bill that would ban gay conversion therapy in the state. She co-sponsored a similar bill when she was a member of the Minnesota House. In May 2019, Omar introduced legislation that would sanction Brunei over a recently introduced law that would make homosexual sex and adultery punishable by death. In June 2019, she participated in Twin Cities Pride in Minnesota. In August 2019, Omar wrote on Twitter in support of the Palestinian LGBT rights group Al Qaws after the Palestinian Authority banned Al Qaws's activities in the West Bank.

Military policy 
Omar has been critical of U.S. foreign policy, and has called for reduced funding for "perpetual war and military aggression," saying, "knowing my tax dollars pay for bombs killing children in Yemen makes my heart break," with "everyone in Washington saying we don't have enough money in the budget for universal health care, we don't have enough money in the budget to guarantee college education for everyone." Omar has criticized the U.S. government's drone assassination program, citing the Obama administration's policy of "droning of countries around the world." She has said, "we don't need nearly 800 military bases outside the United States to keep our country safe."

In 2019, Omar signed a letter led by Representative Ro Khanna and Senator Rand Paul to President Trump asserting that it is "long past time to rein in the use of force that goes beyond congressional authorization" and that they hoped this would "serve as a model for ending hostilities in the futurein particular, as you and your administration seek a political solution to our involvement in Afghanistan."

In May 2020, Omar signed a letter backed by AIPAC calling for the continuation of the UN embargo against Iran, with her office noting that it was a "narrow ask that we couldn’t find anything wrong with." Her office said that she has opposed human rights abuse "for a long time" and that signing onto it should be not be seen as a sign she supports the Trump administration's policy on Iran.

Minimum wage 

Omar supports a $15 hourly minimum wage.

Minneapolis Police Department 

In June 2020, the "defund the police" slogan gained widespread popularity following the murder of George Floyd. Black Lives Matter and other activists used the phrase to call for police budget reductions and a plan to delegate certain police responsibilities to other organizations. Reacting to the murder of Floyd, the majority of the Minneapolis City Council voted to dismantle the city's police department. In a statement, the Minneapolis mayor said they planned to work to address "systemic racism in police culture." Following the murder of Floyd, Omar supported the police abolition movement in Minneapolis that sought to dismantle the Minneapolis Police Department, saying that the department had "proven themselves beyond reform." Omar hoped to see a new police department that would be modeled after the Camden County Police Department in New Jersey.

Syria 
In 2023, Omar was among 56 Democrats to vote in favor of H.Con.Res. 21 which directed President Joe Biden to remove U.S. troops from Syria within 180 days.

Venezuela crisis 
In January 2019, amid the 2019 Venezuelan presidential crisis, Omar joined Democrats Ro Khanna and Tulsi Gabbard in denouncing the Trump administration's decision to recognize Juan Guaidó, the president of the Venezuelan National Assembly, as Venezuela's interim president. She described Trump's action as a "U.S. backed coup" and said that the U.S. should not "hand pick" foreign leaders and should support "Mexico, Uruguay & the Vatican's efforts to facilitate a peaceful dialogue." In response to criticisms of her comments, Omar wrote that "No one is defending Maduro" and that opposing US intervention is not the equivalent of supporting the existing leadership of a country.

In February 2019, Omar questioned whether Elliott Abrams, whom Trump appointed as Special Representative for Venezuela in January 2019, was the correct choice given his past support of right-wing authoritarian regimes in El Salvador and Guatemala, his initial doubts about the number of reported deaths in the El Mozote massacre in 1982, and his two 1991 misdemeanor convictions for withholding information from Congress about the Iran–Contra affair, for which he was later pardoned by George H. W. Bush.

In May 2019, Omar said in an interview on Democracy Now! that she believed U.S. foreign policy and economic sanctions are aimed at regime change and have contributed to the "devastation in Venezuela."

Threats and harassment

DFL caucus attack 
On February 4, 2014, Omar was attacked and wounded by multiple attendees during a DFL caucus for Minnesota's House of Representatives District 60B. She was organizing the event and was a policy aide to Minneapolis City Councilman Andrew Johnson at the time. She sustained a concussion and was sent to the hospital.

Death threats 
In February 2019, the FBI arrested United States Coast Guard Lieutenant Christopher Paul Hasson, who was allegedly plotting to assassinate various journalists and political figures in the United States, including Omar. According to prosecutors, Hasson is a self-described "long time White Nationalist" and former skinhead who wanted to use violence to "establish a white homeland." Prosecutors also alleged that Hasson was in contact with an American neo-Nazi leader, stockpiled weapons, and compiled a hit list.

On April 7, 2019, Patrick Carlineo Jr., was arrested for threatening to assault and murder Omar in a phone call to her office. He reportedly told investigators that he did not want Muslims in the government. In May 2019, Carlineo was released from custody and placed on house arrest. He pleaded guilty to the offense on November 19. Omar asked the court to be lenient with him.

In April 2019, Omar said that she had received more death threats after Trump made comments about her and 9/11, "many directly referencing or replying to the president's video". In August 2019, she published an anonymous threat she had received of being shot at the Minnesota State Fair, saying that such threats were why she now had security protection. In September 2019, she asserted Trump was putting her life in danger by retweeting a tweet falsely claiming she had "partied on the anniversary of 9/11".

Two Republican candidates for congressional office have called for Omar's execution. In November 2019, Danielle Stella, Omar's Republican opponent for Congress, was banned from Twitter for suggesting that Omar be hanged for treason if found guilty of passing information to Iran. In December 2019, George Buck, another Republican running for Congress, also suggested that Omar be hanged for treason. In response, Buck was removed from the National Republican Congressional Committee's Young Guns program. Neither candidate won their primary election.

"Go back to their countries" Trump tweet
On July 14, 2019, Trump tweeted that The Squad—a group that consists of Omar and three other young congresswomen of color, most of whom were born and raised in the U.S.—should "go back" to the "places from which they came". In response, Omar said Trump was "stoking white nationalism" because he was "angry that people like us are serving in Congress and fighting against your hate-filled agenda." Two days later, the House of Representatives voted 240–187 to condemn Trump's "racist comments". On July 17, it was reported that the U.S. Equal Employment Opportunity Commission lists the phrase "Go back to where you came from" as an example of "harassment based on national origin".

At a July 17 campaign rally in North Carolina, Trump made additional comments about The Squad: "They never have anything good to say. That's why I say, 'Hey if you don't like it, let 'em leave, let 'em leave, and "I think in some cases they hate our country". He made a series of false and misleading claims about Omar, including allegations that she had praised al-Qaeda and "smeared" American soldiers who had fought in the Battle of Mogadishu by bringing up the numerous Somali civilian casualties. The crowd reacted by chanting, "Send her back, Send her back." Trump later called the crowd "incredible people, incredible patriots" and accused Omar of racism and antisemitism. On July 19, he falsely claimed that Omar and the rest of The Squad had used the term "evil Jews".

Foreign media has widely covered Trump's remarks about Omar and The Squad. The social media hashtag #IStandWithIlhanOmar was soon trending in the United States and other countries. Many foreign politicians condemned Trump's comments. On July 19, German Chancellor Angela Merkel said, "I reject [Trump's comments] and stand in solidarity with the congresswomen he targeted."

Target of online hate speech

Omar has frequently been the target of online hate speech. According to a study by the Social Science Research Council of more than 113,000 tweets about Muslim candidates in the weeks leading up to the 2018 midterm elections, Omar "was the prime target. Roughly half of the 90,000 tweets mentioning her included hate speech or Islamophobic or anti-immigrant language." According to the study, "Key themes included Muslims as subhumans or 'Trojan horses' seeking to impose Shariah law on America.... A large proportion of these trolls were likely bots or automated accounts run by people, organizations or state actors seeking to spread political propaganda and hate speech. That's based on telltale iconography, naming patterns, webs of linkages and the breadth of the postelection scrubbing."

9/11 comments and World Trade Center cover 
On April 11, 2019, the front page of the New York Post carried an image of the World Trade Center burning following the September 11 terrorist attacks and a quotation from a speech Omar gave the previous month. The headline read, "REP. ILHAN OMAR: 9/11 WAS 'SOME PEOPLE DID SOMETHING, and a caption underneath added, "Here's your something ... 2,977 people dead by terrorism." The Post was quoting a speech Omar had given at a recent Council on American–Islamic Relations (CAIR) meeting. In the speech Omar said, "CAIR was founded after 9/11 because they recognized that some people did something and that all of us [Muslims in the U.S.] were starting to lose access to our civil liberties." (CAIR was founded in 1994, but many new members joined after the 9/11 attacks in 2001.)

On April 12, President Trump retweeted a video that edited Omar's remarks to remove context, showing her saying, "Some people did something." Some Democratic representatives condemned Trump's retweet, predicting that it would incite violence and hatred. House Speaker Nancy Pelosi called on Trump to "take down his disrespectful and dangerous video" and asked the U.S. Capitol Police to increase its protection of Omar.

Speaking at an April 30 protest by black women calling for formal censure of Trump, Omar blamed Trump and his allies for inciting Americans against both Jews and Muslims.

Comments by Lauren Boebert 

In November 2021, Republican Representative Lauren Boebert said she had shared an elevator with Omar, and that she and a Capitol Police officer both mistook Omar for a terrorist. Boebert referred to Omar as the "Jihad Squad". Omar said that she had not shared an elevator with Boebert, that the story was made up, and that Boebert's comments were "anti-Muslim bigotry".

Electoral history

2016

2018

2020

2022

Awards and honors 
Omar received the 2015 Community Leadership Award from Mshale, an African immigrant media outlet based in Minneapolis. The prize is awarded annually on a readership basis.

In 2017, Time magazine named Omar among its "Firsts: Women who are changing the world," a special report on 46 women who broke barriers in their respective disciplines, and featured her on the cover of its September 18 issue. Her family was named one of the "five families who are changing the world as we know it" by Vogue in their February 2018 issue featuring photographs by Annie Leibovitz.

Media appearances 
In 2018, Omar was featured in the music video for Maroon 5's "Girls Like You" featuring Cardi B.

The 2018 documentary film Time for Ilhan (directed by Norah Shapiro, produced by Jennifer Steinman Sternin and Chris Newberry) chronicles Omar's political campaign. It was selected to show at the Tribeca Film Festival and the Mill Valley Film Festival.

Following a July 2019 tweet by Trump that The Squad—a group that consists of Omar and three other congresswomen of color who were born in the United States—should "go back" to the "places from which they came", Omar and the other members of the Squad held a press conference that was taped by CNN and posted to social media.

On October 19, 2020, Omar joined Ocasio-Cortez, Disguised Toast, Jacksepticeye, and Pokimane in a Twitch stream playing the popular game Among Us, encouraging streamers to vote in the 2020 election. This collaboration garnered almost half a million views.

Personal life
In 2002, Omar became engaged to Ahmed Abdisalan Hirsi (né Aden). She has said they had an unofficial, faith-based Islamic marriage. The couple had two children together, including Isra Hirsi, one of the three principal organizers of the school strike for climate in the US. Omar has said that she and Hirsi divorced within their faith tradition in 2008.

In 2009, Omar married Ahmed Nur Said Elmi, a British Somali. According to Omar, in 2011 she and Elmi had a faith-based divorce and she reconciled with Hirsi, with whom she had a third child in 2012. In 2017, Elmi and Omar legally divorced, and Omar and Hirsi legally married in 2018. On October 7, 2019, Omar filed for divorce from Hirsi, citing an "irretrievable breakdown" of the marriage. The divorce was finalized on November 5, 2019.

In March 2020, Omar married Tim Mynett, a political consultant whose political consulting firm, the E Street Group, received $2.78 million in contracts from Omar's campaign during the 2020 cycle. The campaign's contract with Mynett's firm became a focus of criticism by her Democratic primary opponent and conservative critics that received significant local and national media attention. On November 17, 2020, Omar's campaign terminated its contract with Mynett's firm, saying the termination was to "make sure that anybody who is supporting our campaign with their time or financial support feels there is no perceived issue with that support."

In 2020, HarperCollins published Omar's memoir, This Is What America Looks Like, written with Rebecca Paley.

See also 
 List of African-American United States representatives
 List of Muslim members of the United States Congress
 Women in the United States House of Representatives

Notes

References

External links 

 Official House of Representatives site
 Ilhan Omar for Congress
 
 

|-

|-

1982 births
Living people
20th-century African-American people
21st-century African-American women
21st-century American politicians
21st-century American women politicians
21st-century Muslims
African-American members of the United States House of Representatives
African-American Muslims
American campaign managers
American Muslim activists
American politicians of Somalian descent
Democratic Party members of the United States House of Representatives from Minnesota
Edison High School (Minnesota) alumni
Ethnic Somali people
Female members of the United States House of Representatives
Left-wing populism in the United States
Democratic Party members of the Minnesota House of Representatives
Muslim members of the United States House of Representatives
Naturalized citizens of the United States
North Dakota State University alumni
People from Mogadishu
Politicians from Minneapolis
Progressivism in the United States
Somalian emigrants to the United States
Somalian Muslims
University of Minnesota fellows
Women state legislators in Minnesota
20th-century African-American women
Members of the United States Congress stripped of committee assignment